Aspull is a village in the Metropolitan Borough of Wigan, Greater Manchester, England.  The village and the surrounding countryside contain 21 listed buildings that are recorded in the National Heritage List for England.  Of these, one is listed at Grade II*, the middle of the three grades, and the others are at Grade II, the lowest grade.

There has been coal mining in the area from the 16th century, but that has ceased and the area is now rural and residential.  The oldest listed buildings are houses, farmhouses and farm buildings.  The only surviving listed buildings from the coal mining era are a row of miners' cottages and a ventilation chimney.  The Leeds and Liverpool Canal passes through the area, and the listed buildings associated with this are bridges and a flight of locks, and a lock keeper's cottage.  Also listed is a church.


Key

Buildings

References

Citations

Sources

Lists of listed buildings in Greater Manchester